Kareem AJ Hunt (born August 6, 1995) is an American football running back who is a free agent. He played college football at Toledo and was drafted by the Kansas City Chiefs in the third round of the 2017 NFL Draft. As a rookie in 2017, he led the NFL in rushing yards and was selected to the Pro Bowl.

Early years
Hunt attended South High School in Willoughby, Ohio, where he played for the Rebels football team. He rushed for 2,519 yards and 39 touchdowns as a junior and 2,685 yards and 44 touchdowns as a senior. Hunt was rated by Rivals.com as a three-star recruit and committed to the University of Toledo to play college football.

College career
As a freshman at Toledo in 2013, Hunt played in 12 games with three starts and rushed for 866 yards on 137 carries with six touchdowns. He had a strong four-game stretch in the season with 127 rushing yards and two touchdowns against Navy, 114 rushing yards and a touchdown against Bowling Green, 168 rushing yards and two rushing touchdowns against Eastern Michigan, and 186 rushing yards and a touchdown against Buffalo. As a sophomore, he played in 10 games, missing three due to an injury. In the 10 games that he appeared in, he rushed for at least 101 yards in all of them. He rushed for 1,631 yards on 205 carries with 16 touchdowns. He was the MVP of the 2015 GoDaddy Bowl victory over Arkansas State after rushing for 271 yards and five touchdowns, which tied an NCAA record with Barry Sanders.

Hunt was suspended for the first two games of his junior year in 2015 due to a violation of team rules. He returned for the third game, but was injured during the game and missed the next two games. Overall, in the 2015 season, he finished with 973 rushing yards and 12 rushing touchdowns. In 2016, Hunt played all 13 games, leading the MAC in both rush attempts (262) and yards (1,475), including 200 rushing yards in the loss at #14 Western Michigan. His 4,945 career rushing yards broke Chester Taylor's school record, and was third all time in MAC conference history. In addition, he holds career school records for yards per rush (6.3, with a minimum of 100 rushes), and total yards from scrimmage (5,500).

College statistics

Professional career

NFL Draft

Hunt was drafted by the Kansas City Chiefs in the third round (86th overall) of the 2017 NFL Draft. He was the sixth running back to be selected in the draft. In addition, he was the first of three Toledo Rockets to be selected that year.

Kansas City Chiefs

2017 season
Following a knee injury to starting running back Spencer Ware in the Chiefs' third preseason game against the Seattle Seahawks, Hunt was named starting running back for the Chiefs on August 27, 2017.

Hunt made his NFL debut on September 7, 2017, against the New England Patriots. On his first career NFL carry, despite never losing a fumble during his college career, Hunt fumbled, with the ball being recovered by the Patriots' safety Devin McCourty. Hunt went on to catch two touchdown passes – a three-yarder from quarterback Alex Smith late in the first half, and a 78-yarder in the fourth quarter, and punched in a four-yard rushing touchdown in the fourth en route to a 42–27 Chiefs win. Hunt finished with 246 total yards from scrimmage (148 rushing, 98 receiving), the most ever in an NFL debut. He joined stars Marshall Faulk (for the Indianapolis Colts in 1994, 174 yards) and Billy Sims (for the Detroit Lions in 1980, 217 yards), as the only NFL players since 1970 to debut with over 150 scrimmage yards and three touchdowns. His 148 rushing yards led all NFL rushers for Week 1. Hunt was named the AFC Offensive Player of the Month for the month of September after leading the NFL with 401 rushing yards, 538 yards from scrimmage, and 8.53 yards per carry. In a Week 7 31–30 road loss to the Oakland Raiders, he had 117 scrimmage yards for his seventh straight game accomplishing the feat.

On December 19, 2017, Hunt was named to the 2018 Pro Bowl as a rookie. Heading into Week 17, Hunt was third in the NFL in rushing yards behind Todd Gurley and Le'Veon Bell. Both Gurley and Bell were inactive for Week 17 after both teams clinched the playoffs and were resting their players, giving Hunt a chance to claim the rushing title. On his first and only carry of the game, he rushed for a 35-yard touchdown, passing both Bell and Gurley, giving Hunt the rushing yards title for the 2017 season with 1,327 yards. This marked the second season in a row where a rookie led the league in rushing (Ezekiel Elliott in 2016). He was ranked 33rd on the NFL Top 100 Players of 2018.

The Chiefs finished atop the AFC West with a 10–6 record and qualified for the playoffs. In the Wild Card Round against the Tennessee Titans, Hunt rushed for 42 yards and a touchdown on 11 carries in the narrow 22–21 defeat.

2018 season

Hunt remained the Chiefs' primary running back going into the 2018 season. During Week 3, he recorded his second career game with two rushing touchdowns in the 38–27 victory over the San Francisco 49ers. In the next game against the Denver Broncos, he rushed for 121 yards and a touchdown and caught three passes for 54 yards. On October 6, Hunt was fined $26,739 for a hit where he intentionally lowered his helmet. Two weeks later against the New England Patriots, Hunt rushed for 80 yards and caught five passes for 105 yards and a 67-yard touchdown in the 43–40 road loss. In the next game, a 45–10 home victory against the Cincinnati Bengals, he rushed for 86 yards and a touchdown and caught five passes for 55 yards and two touchdowns. Hunt continued his momentum in Week 8 against the Broncos, rushing for 50 yards and catching five passes for 36 yards and a touchdown. In the next game, Hunt rushed for 91 yards and two touchdowns, along with a 50-yard touchdown reception in a 37–21 road victory over the Cleveland Browns, earning him AFC Offensive Player of the Week. During Week 11, in what turned out to be Hunt's final game as a Chief, he rushed for 28 yards and caught six passes for 41 yards and a touchdown as the Chiefs narrowly lost to the Los Angeles Rams on the road by a score of 54–51.

Hunt was released by the Chiefs on November 30, 2018, after a videotape of him physically assaulting a woman and kicking her on the ground the previous February surfaced. Hunt was never charged with any crime, as the incident was investigated as a misdemeanor assault and the victim failed to properly take her case to court.

Cleveland Browns

2019 season

Hunt was signed by the Cleveland Browns on February 11, 2019. Due to the pending investigation from the NFL into the assault allegations against him, Hunt was placed on the Commissioner’s Exempt list after signing his contract. On March 15, 2019, the NFL announced that Hunt had been suspended without pay for the first eight games of the 2019 season for violating the league's personal conduct policy. He was eligible to participate in all off-season workouts and all preseason games. Following the announcement, Hunt was added to the Browns' active roster. On August 29, 2019, Hunt underwent a sports hernia surgery;  he was placed on the reserve/suspended list two days later. As part of the terms of his suspension, he began practicing with the team again on October 21.

Hunt was reinstated from suspension on November 4. He made his first appearance with the Browns in Week 10 against the Buffalo Bills. 

Hunt finished the 2019 season with 43 carries for 179 rushing yards and two rushing touchdowns along with 37 receptions for 285 receiving yards and a receiving touchdown.

2020 season
On March 16, 2020, the Browns placed a second-round restricted free agent tender on Hunt. He signed the tender on April 20, 2020.

On September 8, 2020, the Browns signed Hunt to a two-year, $13.25 million contract extension. In Week 2 against the Cincinnati Bengals, Hunt rushed 10 times for 86 yards and his first rushing touchdown of the season and caught two passes for 15 yards and his first receiving touchdown of the season during the 35–30 win. In Week 4, against the Dallas Cowboys, he had 11 carries for 71 rushing yards and two rushing touchdowns in the 49–38 victory. In Week 10, against the Houston Texans, he had 19 carries for 104 rushing yards in the 10–7 victory.
In Week 14 against the Baltimore Ravens, Hunt recorded 110 yards from scrimmage, one rushing touchdown, and one receiving touchdown during the 42–47 loss. In the 2020 season, Hunt finished with 198	carries for 841 rushing yards and six rushing touchdowns to go along with 38 receptions for 304 receiving yards and five receiving touchdowns.

In the Wild Card Round of the playoffs against the Pittsburgh Steelers, Hunt rushed for 48 yards and two touchdowns during the 48–37 win. In the Divisional Round, Hunt scored a rushing touchdown in the 22–17 loss to the Kansas City Chiefs.

2021 season
Hunt entered the 2021 season as the backup to Nick Chubb. He suffered a calf injury in Week 6 and was placed on injured reserve on October 19, 2021. He was activated on November 27. In the 2021 season, Hunt finished with 78 carries for 386 rushing yards and four rushing touchdowns to go along with 22 receptions for 174 receiving yards in eight games.

2022 season
On August 7, 2022, Hunt requested a trade from the Browns however the team declined his trade request. Hunt is in the last year of a two-year deal and he is set to make $6.25 million in the 2022 season. Hunt will be an unrestricted free agent next offseason. In Week 1, Hunt recorded one rushing touchdown and one receiving touchdown in the 26–24 victory over Carolina.

NFL career statistics

Regular season

Postseason

Video controversy

On November 30, 2018, TMZ released a video of Hunt involved in kicking a woman in a hotel from the previous February. Later that same day, Hunt was placed on the commissioner's exempt list, prohibiting him from practicing and playing with the team. Shortly after being placed on the exempt list, the Chiefs released him. Chiefs co-owner and CEO Clark Hunt released a statement following his release indicating that Hunt was not truthful when the Chiefs asked him about the incident.

References

External links
 
 Toledo Rockets bio
 Cleveland Browns bio

1995 births
Living people
American Conference Pro Bowl players
American football running backs
Cleveland Browns players
Kansas City Chiefs players
People from Willoughby, Ohio
Players of American football from Ohio
Sportspeople from Greater Cleveland
Toledo Rockets football players